Mindo (also known as the Mindo Valley) is a mountainous watershed in the western slopes of the Andes, where two of the most biologically diverse ecoregions in the world meet: the Chocoan lowlands and the Tropical Andes.

Politically, Mindo is a collection of rural parishes (Gualea, Nanegal, Nanegalito, Pacto) that make up the Noroccidental Administrative Zone of Quito Canton, and parts of Los Bancos Canton within Pichincha Province in the northern sierra region of Ecuador.

Tourism
The Mindo Valley is among the most heavily visited tourist locations in Ecuador. Mindo was recently named the Ruta de Cacao by The Ecuadorian Ministerio de Turismo. Nearly 200,000 tourists visit the area annually to enjoy activities such as rafting, tubing, trekking, mountain biking, canyoning, horseback riding, birdwatching, Chocolate Making and herping. Besides its well-developed tourism infrastructure, it offers several private reserves and lodges known for their montane forests, waterfalls and unique cloud forest biodiversity. Much of the land is privately protected, and an additional  falls within the Mindo-Nambillo Ecological Reserve.

References

External links 
 

Parishes of Ecuador
Geography of Pichincha Province
Tourist attractions in Pichincha Province